Lynn Headley (born 7 April 1943) is a Jamaican sprinter. He competed in the men's 100 metres at the 1964 Summer Olympics.

References

1943 births
Living people
Athletes (track and field) at the 1964 Summer Olympics
Jamaican male sprinters
Olympic athletes of Jamaica
Athletes (track and field) at the 1966 British Empire and Commonwealth Games
Commonwealth Games silver medallists for Jamaica
Commonwealth Games medallists in athletics
Sportspeople from Kingston, Jamaica
Central American and Caribbean Games medalists in athletics
Medallists at the 1966 British Empire and Commonwealth Games